The Congressional Friends of Denmark was a caucus of the 111th Congress. Its members were Majority Leader Steny Hoyer (D-Maryland) and Howard Coble (R-North Carolina).

See also
Denmark–United States relations
Rufus Gifford

111th United States Congress
Caucuses of the United States Congress
Danish-American history